Umm Al Houl is an industrial district in Qatar located in the municipality of Al Wakrah. To the north of Umm Al Houl is the city of Al Wakrah while Mesaieed is to the south.

The government has designated the district as a free economic zone starting in early 2019. Qatar's largest seaport, Hamad Port, is located here.

Etymology
The first constituent, 'umm', is the Arabic word for mother and is a common prefix used to denote geographical features. 'Houl' is an Arabic term reserved for a type of snare. Historically, birds of considerable size were commonly caught here using traps, lending the area its name.

Geography

History
In 1895 the Sheikh of Abu Dhabi attempted to claim it as his western frontier but his claim was rejected by his superiors in the British government.

J.G. Lorimer's Gazetteer of the Persian Gulf gives an account of Umm Al Houl in 1908, referring to it as "Dohat [bay] Umm al-Hūl" and giving its location as 5 miles south of Al Wakrah. He goes on to state:

Umm Al Houl Power Plant
After being launched in 2015, the Umm Al Houl Power Plant was commissioned in March 2018. The plant has the capacity to desalinate 136.5 million gallons of water daily, meeting approximately 40% of Qatar's requirement, as well as a generation capacity of 2,520 MW.

Transport
Currently, the elevated Umm Al Houl Metro Station is under construction, having been launched during Phase 2A. Once completed, it will be part of Doha Metro's Red Line South.

Gallery

References

Populated places in Al Wakrah